Sourcegraph is a code search and code intelligence tool that semantically indexes and analyzes large codebases so that they can be searched across commercial, open-source, local, and cloud-based repositories. Sourcegraph supports all major programming languages.

History 
Sourcegraph was developed by Stanford graduates Quinn Slack and Beyang Liu and was first released in 2013. Partly inspired by Liu's experience using Google Code Search while he was a Google intern, Sourcegraph was developed to "tackle the big code problem" by enabling developers to manage large codebases that span multiple repositories, programming languages, file formats, and projects. 

Sourcegraph can be used to search and analyze all of an organization's code. During search indexing, the platform builds a global reference graph, which maps an entire codebase and enables functionality such as "go to definition".

Sourcegraph software was initially self-hosted by each customer on their own infrastructure. Early customers included Uber, Dropbox, and Lyft.

In 2016, Sourcegraph was criticized for being provided with a Fair Source License with the developers explaining that "all of Sourcegraph’s source code is publicly available and hackable" and was aimed to "help open sourcers strike a balance between getting paid and preserving their values". In 2018, Sourcegraph was licensed under the Apache License 2.0. and Sourcegraph OSS has since been released under the Apache License 2.0 while the commercial version, Sourcegraph Enterprise, has been released under its own license.

In 2019, Sourcegraph was integrated into the GitLab codebase, giving GitLab users access to a browser-based developer platform.

In 2021, a browser-based portal became available enabling users to search open-source projects and personal private code for free.
In 2022, Sourcegraph Cloud, a commercial single-tenant cloud solution for organizations with over 100 developers, was launched.

Applications 
In research, Sourcegraph has been applied to develop data mining methods for downstream dependencies and to aid in the refactoring and translation of a program into its equivalent in a different programming language.

Sourcegraph is used in the CERN Accelerator Control software community to index code, quickly search through it, and create statistics.

In cybersecurity, Sourcegraph has been used for better insights into source code during penetration tests.

As of July 2021, some of Sourcegraph's customers include Adidas, Lyft, Uber, Yelp, Plaid, GE, Atlassian, Amazon, PayPal, Qualtrics, and Cloudflare.

Core features 
The core Sourcegraph product has two versions:
 Sourcegraph Open Source (Sourcegraph OSS), which is free to use and only includes Sourcegraph's universal code search functionality.
 Sourcegraph Enterprise (previously Sourcegraph Data Center), which includes the Sourcegraph code intelligence platform and has a free tier for a limited number of users.

Code can be searched and navigated from the Sourcegraph web UI or using browser and IDE extensions and text editor plugins. Sourcegraph supports over 30 programming languages and integrates with GitHub and GitLab for code hosting, Codecov for code coverage, and Jira Software for project management.

Code Search 
Sourcegraph's "universal code search" tool is used to search, explore, and understand code. Search can be implemented across multiple repositories and code hosting platforms. Search can be literal, regular expression, or structural. Structural search syntax is language-aware and handles nested expressions and multi-line statements better than regular expressions. Sourcegraph's Code Search uses a variation of Google's PageRank algorithm to rank results by relevance.

Code Navigation 
Sourcegraph's Code Navigation feature can be used to jump to the definition of a variable or function, or find all references to it in a codebase.

Batch Changes 
Sourcegraph's Batch Changes feature allows developers and companies to automate and track large-scale code refactors, security fixes, and migrations across repositories and code hosts.

Code Insights 
Sourcegraph's Code Insights feature extracts data from a codebase to provide detailed analytics and visualizations to track the state and progress of a code project.

Ownership 
The software is developed by a company of the same name and has raised a total of almost $225 million in financing to date.

See also 
 SaaS
 Code review software

References 

Database management systems
Code search engines